Fernyhalgh Wood is a woodland in Fulwood, Preston, Lancashire, England. It is owned and managed by the Woodland Trust.

References

Forests and woodlands of Lancashire
Geography of the City of Preston
Geography of Preston